Joyce Nizzari (born May 20, 1940) is an American model, dancer, and actress. She was Playboy magazine's Playmate of the Month for its December 1958 issue. Her centerfold was photographed by Bunny Yeager. She was born in The Bronx, New York and is of Italian descent.

Model career
Yeager discovered Nizzari in Miami when she was 15, but only had her do bikini shots until after Joyce turned 18. In August 1957, Nizzari won a cup awarded by the Florida Photographers Association. She was chosen queen of its annual convention.

She dated Hugh Hefner for a few years following her Playmate appearance, and she worked as a Bunny at the first Playboy Club in Chicago. In the late 1990s, Joyce returned to the Playboy fold full-time as one of Hefner's assistants in the Playboy Mansion.

Film actress
Nizzari appears in two films starring Frank Sinatra: A Hole In The Head (1959) and Come Blow Your Horn (1963). In the latter, a Paramount Pictures release, she played a zany interpretive dancer named Snow. When she signed to play in Come Blow Your Horn, Nizzari had completed Chips Off the Old Block, a Barry Ashton dance revue, at the Statler Hilton in Los Angeles. She also played a bit part in the slapstick comedy The Great Race with Jack Lemmon and Tony Curtis.

Marriage
Nizzari was married to character actor Jack Hogan.

Filmography
 Green Acres - "Eb Discovers the Birds and the Bees" (1966) as Cigarette Girl
 Petticoat Junction - The Windfall (1966) as Hat Check Girl
 The Beverly Hillbillies
 "Brewster's Baby" (1966) as Kitty Kat Showgirl
 "Clampett's Millions" (1965) as Mabel Slocum
 "Double Naught Jethro" (1965) as Mabel Slocum
 The Great Race (1965) (uncredited) as Woman in West
 Burke's Law
 "Who Killed the Grand Piano?" (1965) as Bunny #2, 'Tammy'
 "Who Killed Hamlet?" (1965) as 1st Girl at Bar
 "Who Killed Molly?" (1964) as Molly Baker
 Pajama Party (1964) as Pajama Girl
 Seven Days in May (1964) (uncredited)
 The Candidate (1964) as Party Girl
 Come Blow Your Horn (1963) as Snow Eskanazi
 Playboy's Penthouse - Episode dated October 24, 1959 (1959)
 A Hole in the Head (1959) as Alice (Jerry's secretary)
 The Wild Women of Wongo (1958) as Woman of Wongo

See also
 List of people in Playboy 1953–1959

References

Hayward, California Daily Review, Joyce Nizzari Gets Sinatra Film Role, January 6, 1963, Page 46.
Long Beach, California Press-Telegram, Queen of Florida Photogs, August 21, 1957, Page 11.

External links
 
 

1950s Playboy Playmates
American film actresses
American television actresses
Actresses from New York City
People from the Bronx
1940 births
Living people
American people of Italian descent
Playboy Playmates of the Year
21st-century American women